The Abazović Cabinet is the 43rd cabinet of Montenegro. It was elected on 28 April 2022 by a majority vote in the parliament. The minority government is composed of Civic Movement URA, Socialist People's Party, Bosniak Party, Albanian Coalition and Albanian List and was supported by the Democratic Party of Socialists and Liberal Party.

On 10 July 2022, DPS and SDP announced a motion of no confidence to the Abazović Cabinet due to the adoption of the draft Fundamental Agreement between Montenegro and the Serbian Orthodox Church. It passed on 20 August 2022.

Cabinet composition

Party breakdown

Cabinet members 

Source:

Former members

References 

Government of Montenegro
Cabinets established in 2022
2022 establishments in Montenegro